Wendell Rodricks (28 May 1960 – 12 February 2020) was an Indian fashion designer and author based in the Indian state of Goa. He was also an activist for social causes, environment and gay rights. In 2014, the Government of India conferred upon him its fourth-highest civilian award, the Padma Shri.

Early life
Rodricks was born on 28 May 1960 to Goan Catholic parents, Greta and Felix in Parel, Bombay. He was the eldest brother to Robin, Chester and Joel. The original surname of the family was "Rodrigues", but changed to "Rodricks" after a misspelling during his grandfather's time. He grew up in Mahim and attended St. Michael's High School in Mahim. After completing school, he took a graduate diploma in catering. After this, he joined as assistant director of the Royal Oman Police (ROP) Officers Club in the city of Muscat in 1982. However, he did not pursue these professions but moved to fashion designing. He began by using his savings to study fashion in Los Angeles and Paris.

Career

Fashion
Rodricks began his career in fashion by designing for Garden Vareli, Lakmé Cosmetics and DeBeers. When in Paris with his first portfolio in hand, he was advised to put "your country in your clothes". He launched his own label in 1989 with his first show held at the Regal Room of the Oberoi Hotel, Mumbai. His first collection consisted of twelve ensembles, with model Mehr Jesia. Out of these, only six were complete outfits. He did not have enough funds for supplying all models with shoes or bottoms for their organza tunics. Henceforth, Rodricks' work involved a wide range of fashion, from lecturing on world costume history (at SNDT Women's University) to fashion journalism and styling for international advertising campaigns. He was the first Indian designer to be invited to IGEDO (the world's largest garment fair) in 1995; the first Indian designer to open the Dubai Fashion Week in 2001; and was invited to present at the Paris Fashion Week Pret a Porter salon in 2007. He was a fellow design member of the Fashion Design Council of India.

Rodricks was known for pioneering the idea of resort wear and for advocating eco-friendly fashion. In 2010, he revived the traditional Goan attire of the kunbi sari. He convinced Pratibha Patil, Priyanka Gandhi and Sonia Gandhi to be its patrons, thus increasing the cost from a meagre Rs. 700 to more than Rs. 7000, for the benefit of the weavers. He was also a part of the khadi movement, and even promoted it at the world's largest organic fair, BioFach, at Nuremberg, Germany, in 2011 when he was invited there. In 2017, he presented a collection for plus-size women at the Lakme Fashion Week in 2017.

Rodricks dressed many over the decades. When his close friend Lisa Ray decided to get married in 2012, she chose a gown designed by him. In 2014, he paid tribute to actress Rekha at the Wills Lifestyle India Fashion Week (WIFW), on the occasion of her 60th birthday. Rodricks helped Deepika Padukone, who had been modelling with him for roughly two years then, grab her role in Om Shanti Om by recommending her to Malaika Arora, who in turn recommended her to Farah Khan in 2007. He also helped Anushka Sharma, launching her as a model in his 2007 Les Vamps Show at the Lakme Fashion Week and encouraged her to move to Mumbai when she was just 18 years old.

In 2016, he announced his retirement from his label, to concentrate on his museum. He handed over creative control to his student, Schulen Fernandes, who first worked with him in 1999.

Acting
Rodricks made cameo appearances in the 2003 film Boom and in the television play True West in 2002. He also played himself in the 2008 film Fashion.

Writing
Rodricks contributed to journals of travel and art, and wrote about food, especially Goan cuisine.

Later in 2012, Rodricks released his autobiography, titled The Green Room. It came about as the result of a writing challenge by a fellow author.

In 2017, he released Poskem: Goans in the Shadows. It is a work of fiction about poskem, orphans taken in by well-off Goan families, who were employed as servants. The book features illustrations by Mario Miranda.

Other pursuits
From 1993 on Rodricks resided in a 450-year-old house in Colvale, named "Casa Dona Maria". In 2016, he and his partner moved to a smaller house nearby to convert the larger one into a museum of Goan fashion, named the "Moda Goa Museum and Research Centre". The museum was slated to open to the public in March 2020. Rodricks worked on collecting exhibits for it since 1998, when he began his research into Goa's costumes and clothing. He had since collected 800 exhibits, ranging from an original pano bhaju, to Reita Faria's bathing suit (which won her the title of Miss World in 1966), to an apsara found in a nearby field dating to a Buddhist monastery from the 7th century.

Rodricks was also one of the speakers at TEDxPanaji 2019.

Activism
Rodricks wrote a column in the Goa-based monthly Goa Today, where he often raised issues of social concerns and the environment. In the mid-2000s, he began a mailing list with Margaret Mascarenhas, urging citizens to report cases of lack of waste management. He spoke out against the IRFW (India Resort Fashion Week) in 2012 stating that it "damages the environment". In 2018, he started a helpline for the LGBTQ community with the help of Ruby Almeida, the co-chair of Global Network of Rainbow Catholics. In 2019, he petitioned against the demolition of a 100-year-old church in Colvale, Goa. He had previously closed one of his boutiques in a resort owned by a mine owner, in protest of the illegal mining in Goa. He also unsuccessfully campaigned against the cutting down of six mango trees to make a highway in Colvale, citing that they were more than 200 years old.

Wendell Rodricks was a patron of the KASHISH Mumbai International Queer Film Festival, the annual LGBTQ film festival in Mumbai, and instituted an award for Best Poster Design in 2012  and continued to support the award every year. He also picked the winning entry every year as the Honorary Judge, with his keen aesthetic eye.

Awards
 Padma Shri in 2014
 Chevalier de l'Ordre des Arts et Lettres in 2015
 Rainbow Warrior Award in 2014 by KASHISH Mumbai International Queer Film Festival

Reception
In December 2016, Rodricks displayed his collection of the history of Goan costumes at the Serendipity Arts Festival. However, Goa University's professor and head of the history department Dr. Pratima Kamat pointed out historical inaccuracies in the text displayed alongside the exhibits.

In 2018, Rodricks accused Payal Khandwala, whom he had previously mentored, of copying his technique of pleating the fabric.

Personal life
Rodricks was actively homosexual since he was 19 years old, and formalized his relationship with a wealthy French businessman named Jerome Marrel in a Civil solidarity pact in Paris in 2002. He had met Marrel in Oman through a friend who set them up while Rodricks was working there for the Royal Oman Police (ROP) Officers Club in 1983. Rodricks credited Marrel for his success as a fashion designer, in his autobiography, The Green Room. They both loved travelling and had visited over 150 countries together.

Rodricks lived and worked in Bombay (Mumbai) until the 1993 Bombay bombings, following which he moved with his partner Marrell and their pet dogs to his ancestral village of Colvale in Goa. He donated towards the improvement of the village and started a scholarship for the toppers of the schools of the village, in memory of his parents.

Rodricks was raised Roman Catholic, but his same-sex relationship incurred automatic excommunication.
He was the godfather of Arhaan Khan, the son of the film-maker Arbaaz Khan and his ex-wife Malaika Arora. Rodricks played a large role in forming the career of Arora and remained close to her and her family.

Death
Rodricks died on 12 February 2020 at his residence in Colvale, Goa, at the age of 59. On 13 February, the Goa Police announced that they were still investigating the cause of his death, although it was allegedly reported that he had been suffering from a prolonged illness. A close friend of his reported that he had died due to heart failure during an afternoon nap. His funeral was held on 13 February at the St Francis of Assisi Church, Colvale.

References

External links

  
 
 

2020 deaths
1960 births
Artists from Goa
Indian Roman Catholics
Indian male fashion designers
Gay men
LGBT fashion designers
Indian LGBT artists
Indian LGBT writers
LGBT Roman Catholics
Recipients of the Padma Shri in other fields
Chevaliers of the Ordre des Arts et des Lettres